Zamenhof is a Polish-Jewish surname. Notable people with the surname include:

L. L. Zamenhof (1859–1917), Polish ophthalmologist, philologist, and the inventor of Esperanto
 Mark Zamenhof (1837–1907), L.L.'s father
 Klara Zamenhof (1863–1924), L.L.'s wife
Adam Zamenhof (1888–1940), Polish ophthalmologist, the son of L. L. Zamenhof
Lidia Zamenhof (1904–1942), Polish Esperantist, the daughter of L. L. Zamenhof
Zofia Zamenhof (1889-1942), Polish daughter of L.L. Zamenhof
Louis-Christophe Zaleski-Zamenhof (1925–2019), civil and marine engineer, grandson of L. L. Zamenhof